Liege/CNRL Aerodrome  was located  east of Liege, Alberta, Canada.

References

Defunct airports in Alberta
Municipal District of Opportunity No. 17